Raymond Joseph O'Brien (October 31, 1894 – March 31, 1942 in St. Louis, Missouri) was a professional baseball player. He played a total of 16 games as an outfielder for the 1916 Pittsburgh Pirates. From 1913 to 1932, O'Brien also played for various minor league teams.

References

Pittsburgh Pirates players
Major League Baseball outfielders
Baseball players from Missouri
1894 births
1942 deaths
Texarkana Tigers players
Davenport Blue Sox players
Nashville Vols players
Fort Worth Panthers players
Omaha Buffaloes players
Wichita Falls Spudders players
Denver Bears players
St. Joseph Saints players